Anthony John Gutman (born May 1974) is a British banker, the co-head of Goldman Sachs' UK investment banking business.

Early life
Gutman earned a bachelor's degree in Modern History from Worcester College, Oxford, and a CPE and LPC diploma from the London College of Law.

Career
Gutman worked for Citigroup from 2000 to 2007, where he reported to David Wormsley.

Gutman advised on the flotation of Merlin theme parks, Pets at Home retail chain, Virgin Money, and the B&M discount retail chain, and was due for a "multimillion-pound bonus" in 2015.

Gutman is a director of Axiom Europe.

Personal life
Gutman is married with three children.

References

1974 births
British bankers
Living people
Alumni of Worcester College, Oxford
Place of birth missing (living people)
Goldman Sachs people
Citigroup people